"Plato's Dream" (original French title "Songe de Platon") is a 1756 short story written in the 18th century by the French philosopher and satirist Voltaire. Along with his 1752 novella Micromégas, "Plato's Dream" is among the first modern works in the genre of science fiction.

"Plato's Dream" is a pointed philosophical criticism of religious doctrine, told as a dream contained within the framework of a famous (and religiously-tolerated) personality of antiquity. His story recounts a dream attributed to Greek philosopher Plato, in which Demiurgos, a god-like entity referred to as the "eternal geometer", charges a number of "lesser superbeings" with the task of creating their own worlds. Demogorgon, the being which ultimately creates the planet we know as Earth, is at first quite pleased with his creation, only to find his eminently imperfect handiwork the subject of ridicule by the other beings. Up to a point, it is based on the platonic dialogues 'Timaeus' and 'Critias'.

See also 
Gulliver's Travels
Frankenstein
The Last Man
Utopia

External links
 Online text of Plato's Dream

1756 short stories
French short stories
French science fiction
Science fiction short stories
Works by Voltaire